Wotten Waven is a village in Dominica's Roseau Valley. It has a population of 226 people.

References

Populated places in Dominica